Yellowknife Transit is the public transportation agency in the city of Yellowknife, Northwest Territories, Canada. The municipally funded and controlled system is the territory's only public transport system and is operated privately by First Canada. It also operates the paratransit service, Yellowknife Accessible Transit System (YATS).

History
Yellowknife Transit is the fourth operator of public transit in Yellowknife. Three other privately run services had provided bus service prior to 1999, when Cardinal Coach Lines was awarded the franchise:
 Red Dusseault, 1945–1948.
 Frame and Perkins Limited, 1948–1990.
 Arctic Frontier Carriers Limited, 1990–1999.

As of 2008 the city was actively exploring means of improving transit service, noting that the city had a substantial number of residents who preferred to walk and ride. In August 2012 the city approved a new contract with Cardinal's successor, First Canada, at a cost of $1.25 million per year.

Routes 
There are three regular daily bus routes which run from 6:30 am to 7:30 pm on weekdays and Saturdays. Two additional limited stop express services which operated along Route 1 between the northern suburbs and the downtown core during morning and afternoon peak times have been eliminated. There is no service on Sunday or statutory holidays. The transfer station is located at Sir John Franklin High School.

See also

 Public transport in Canada

References

External links
  Yellowknife Transit fleet

Transit agencies in the Northwest Territories
Transit